Foraminoplasty is a type of endoscopic surgery used to operate on the spine. It is considered a minimally invasive surgery technique and its endoscopic laser is legally regulated. Although most patients have benefited from foraminoplasty, the National Institute for Health and Care Excellence does not fully support it due to it not completing its randomised controlled clinical trial.

References

Further reading

External links
 http://ijssurgery.com/10.14444/1026 
 https://www.nice.org.uk/guidance/ipg31/informationforpublic

Neurosurgical procedures
Minimally-invasive surgery